Nabire is a town in the Indonesian province of Central Papua, at the western end of New Guinea. The town is the administrative seat of the Nabire Regency, and has been designated to be the administrative capital of the new province. It is served by Douw Aturure Airport.

Geography
The town lies on the northern coast of the island on  Cenderawasih Bay.

Climate
Nabire has a tropical rainforest climate (Af) with heavy to very heavy rainfall year-round.

Attractions 
Nabire a tourist resort, with numerous attractions, including: 
 sea garden of Cenderawasih bay with 130 species of coral, 
 Wahario Beach also known as Gedo Beach Youth Tourism Park, is located in Sanoba Village.
 Pepaya island with ideal conditions for diving, 
 hot springs, water temperature up to 80 °C.

Notable inhabitants 
 Marthen Douw
 Patrich Wanggai

See also 
Nabire Airport

References 

Populated places in Central Papua
Regency seats of Central Papua